Mike Miron (born September 11, 1980, in Capreol, Ontario) is a former professional box lacrosse goaltender.  In the National Lacrosse League he was a member of the Rochester Knighthawks, Arizona Sting, and the Columbus Landsharks.

Mike References

1980 births
Living people
Arizona Sting players
Canadian lacrosse players
Lacrosse people from Ontario
National Lacrosse League All-Stars
Rochester Knighthawks players
Sportspeople from Greater Sudbury